Jessica Mbangeni (born August 22, 1977) is a South African praise poet and singer. Born and raised in Nqamakwe, Eastern Cape, she rose to prominence after participating on Soweto Gospel Choir in 2002.

She has also pursued an acting career. In 2013, Mbangeni made her on-screen feature debut in Zabalaza, and appeared as a guest on the television series Skeem Saam. Other television series Mbangeni has appeared in include eKasi: Our Stories (2015), The Coconuts, and Dube on 2.

Career 
Jessica Mbangeni was born August 22, 1977 in Nqamakwe, Eastern Cape. Mbangeni attended Eastern Cape Technikon, but dropped out to purse his career in music.

Shortly after Mbangeni left tertiary, she relocated to Johannesburg to search for job.

In 2002, she joined Soweto Gospel Choir and toured around the globe.

Two years later in 2005, Mbangeni pursued her career as a poet.

Towards the end of the August 2014, Mbangeni announced released date of her live album IGoli which was performed live at Lyric Theatre. The album was released on September 26, 2014.

Her studio album Busiswe Tribute to African Heroines was released in 2015.

Mbangeni was featured on "As'phelelanga" a single by South African singer Vusi Nova released on August 17, 2018.

Television 
From 2004 to 2006, Mbangeni made on screen debut on Dube on 2 comedy television series.

In 2015, she portrayed a role of Nambasa on eKasi: Our Stories drama series.

Other ventures 
Mbangeni established her agency KwaNtu Entertainment and Designs Agency in 2006.

Discography 
 Igoli (2014)
 Busiswe Tribute to African Heroines (2015)

Awards

References

External links 
 Jessica Mbangeni as TVSA
Living people
1977 births
Xhosa people
South African singers